San Pablo del Monte is a municipality in Tlaxcala in south-eastern Mexico.

See also
San Isidro Buensuceso

References

Municipalities of Tlaxcala